Jaroslav (Jarik) Nešetřil (born March 13, 1946, in Brno) is a Czech mathematician, working at Charles University in Prague.  His research areas include combinatorics (structural combinatorics, Ramsey theory), graph theory (coloring problems, sparse structures), algebra (representation of structures, categories, homomorphisms), posets (diagram and dimension problems), computer science (complexity, NP-completeness).

Education and career
Nešetřil received his Ph.D. from Charles University in 1973 under the supervision of Aleš Pultr and Gert Sabidussi. He is responsible for more than 300 publications. Since 2006, he is chairman of the Committee of Mathematics of Czech Republic (the Czech partner of IMU).

Jaroslav Nešetřil is Editor in Chief of Computer Science Review and INTEGERS: the Electronic Journal of Combinatorial Number Theory.
He is also honorary editor of Electronic Journal of Graph Theory and Applications. Since 2008, Jaroslav  Nešetřil belongs to the Advisory Board of the Academia Sinica.

Awards and honors
He was awarded the state prize (1985 jointly with Vojtěch Rödl) for a collection of papers in Ramsey theory. The book Sparsity - Graphs, Structures, and Algorithms he co-authored with Patrice Ossona de Mendez was included in ACM Computing Reviews
list of Notable Books and Articles of 2012.

Nešetřil is a corresponding member of the German Academy of Sciences since 1996 and has been declared Doctor Honoris Causa of the University of Alaska (Fairbanks) in 2002. He has also been declared Doctor Honoris Causa of the University of Bordeaux 1 in 2009; the speech he made in French at this occasion attracted a great deal of attention. He received in 2010 the Medal of Merit of Czech Republic and the Gold medal of Faculty of Mathematics and Physics, Charles University in 2011. In 2012, he has been elected to the Academia Europaea. Also, he has been
elected honorary member of the Hungarian Academy of Sciences in 2013.

He was an invited speaker of the European Congress of Mathematics, in Amsterdam, 2008, and invited speaker (by both the Logic and Foundations and Combinatorics sections) at the Combinatorics session of the International Congress of Mathematicians, in Hyderabad, 2010.

In 2018, on the occasion of the 670th anniversary of the establishment of Charles University, Nešetřil has received from the rector of Charles university the Donatio Universitatis Carolinae prize “for his contribution to mathematics and for his leading role in establishing a world-renowned group in discrete mathematics at Charles University”.

Books

 
  2008 2nd edition (hbk); 2009 2nd edition (pbk)
 
 
 
  2012 pbk reprint

References

External links
 

1946 births
Living people
Czechoslovak mathematicians
20th-century Czech mathematicians
21st-century Czech mathematicians
Graph theorists
Recipients of Medal of Merit (Czech Republic)
Members of Academia Europaea
Academic staff of Charles University
People from Brno